The 2011 Intercontinental Le Mans Cup was the second and final Season running of the Automobile Club de l'Ouest's (ACO) Intercontinental Le Mans Cup, an international auto racing championship for manufacturers and teams. The Cup featured endurance races from the American Le Mans Series, Le Mans Series, and a stand-alone event in Zhuhai, China. Championships were held for Le Mans Prototype 1 (LMP1), Le Mans Prototype 2 (LMP2), Le Mans Grand Touring Endurance – Professional (LMGTE Pro) and Le Mans Grand Touring Endurance – Amateur (LMGTE Am) category cars.

Schedule
On 29 November 2010, the ACO announced an initial 2011 calendar with seven events, expanding from just three in 2010. The most notable new addition was the 24 Hours of Le Mans which returned as a round of a championship series for the first time since the final World Sportscar Championship season in 1992. Double points were awarded for the event at Le Mans.  The Sebring and Road Atlanta rounds were held in conjunction with the American Le Mans Series, while the Spa, Imola, and Silverstone rounds were shared with the Le Mans Series.  Zhuhai was solely a round of the ILMC.

Entries

Results and standings

Race results
Note that for each individual races, cars not competing in the Intercontinental Cup may have won their respective class.  However, only the highest finishing Cup entrant is listed below.

Overall winners in bold.

Scoring system 
The cup's scoring system was revamped for 2011, changing the point structure, how many cars could obtain points, and adding more bonus point opportunities.  Each car had the opportunity to score from one to fifteen points for their position within their class plus an additional point for being the fastest qualifier in their class (pole-sitter) and an additional one or two bonus points for meeting special engine use conditions.

Points were awarded to cars based on their final classification within their class for each event, including both ILMC entries and other race entries.  Thus, it was possible for first-place (or any other position) points to not be awarded if that position in the race was achieved by a non-ILMC entry.  Cars which were not classified per the rules of the event, or which did not complete at least 70% of the distance completed by the winner of their class, received zero points for their finishing position.  All cars which were classified, but finished beyond 12th place in their class, received a single point.  For manufacturers, points were awarded to the top two finishing cars of each manufacturer in each event, but for teams this was reduced to only their top finisher.  Position points were doubled for the 24 Hours of Le Mans event.

Bonus points were expanded in 2011.  The pole-sitter bonus was retained, with a single point being awarded for qualifying fastest in class for each event.  As with position points, this included all entrants in the event, so the entrant needed to outpace not only all ILMC entries, but all non-ILMC entries in their class as well to obtain the bonus point.  2011 also saw up to two additional bonus points made available to LMGTE manufacturers and teams in the form of an engine bonus.  Engines were tightly controlled by the organizers, and their running time was tracked (including practice, qualifying, and race hours).  For engines which accumulated 15 or more hours by the end of a race, the entrant would receive a bonus point.  A second point was available if the engine reached 30 hours by the end of a race.  Cars had to be classified finishers to obtain the engine bonus, but would still get the pole-sitter bonus even if they did not complete the race.  Engine bonus points were not awarded for the 24 Hours of Le Mans event.

Manufacturers' Cups
Peugeot and Audi returned to the competition competing for the premier title of LMP1 manufacturer, both bringing new cars.  Peugeot was able to continue their success from 2010, winning all but one race and outscoring Audi in every event.  Audi was unable to use their new R18 in the first event, and while the new car would be quick enough to win the pole at two events and pick up the make's only win of the season at the prestigious 24 Hours of Le Mans, it would ultimately prove unable to pace the Peugeots over the balance of the season and Audi was not able to be competitive in the standings as a result.

The change in class arrangement for 2011 meant that both LMGTE Pro and LMGTE Am classes were combined into a single cup for manufacturers, as they both used the same cars.  Points for position were awarded based on the cars' ranking among all LMGTE cars, both professional and amateur.  Ferrari, which equipped five of the ten customer teams, took the championship after a season-long battle with BMW, which had to rely solely on the success of its factory team.  BMW started and ended the season with one-two victories, but it was not enough to overcome the Ferraris.  Porsche and Chevrolet both had strong seasons, but their LMGTE Am teams could not keep pace with the Pro teams and they never were a significant threat to Ferrari or BMW.  The Corvettes highlighted their season with a victory at the 24 Hours of Le Mans.

Team Cups
2011 saw the team cups for all four classes hotly contested.  Peugeot's factory team was able to retain the LMP1 title.  Audi's Joest team was able to briefly take the lead in the standings after their victory at the 24 Hours of Le Mans, which netted double points, but the Peugeot Sport Total team would run the table for the rest of the season, not only winning every race, but even gathering the pole-sitter bonus points for each one as well.  Aston Martin's new AMR-One car proved to be a failure, and the team's late-season return with the Lola B09/60 was too late to make an impact.  Oreca won the season opening round, and performed well in other races, but did not compete in all rounds.  Non-manufacturer LMP1 teams were well off of the pace of the manufacturer-supported teams and despite season-long participation were not able to challenge for the cup.  The LMP2 cup was essentially a battle between Signatech and OAK Racing, with Level 5 Motorsports failing to compete season-long.  AF Corse carried its 2010 GT2 class success forward into the new LMGTE Pro class against a strong effort by the BMW Motorsport team, while Larbre's Corvette performed well through the season netting the team the cup in the LMGTE Am class against several competitors.

Several teams changed the type of car they ran during the Cup.  Audi Sport Team Joest started the season with the older Audi R15 TDI plus (powered by an Audi TDI 5.5 L Turbo V10 diesel engine), while in the LMGTE Pro class, AF Corse entered the first event with a Ferrari F430 GTE.  In both cases, the teams switched to their new car for the second event.  Aston Martin Racing had intended to run their troubled Aston Martin AMR-One car in the LMP1 class, but extended testing prevented it entering the first two events.  After its unsuccessful debut at Le Mans, the fourth round at Imola was skipped as well and ultimately, the team would switch to the older Lola-Aston Martin B09/60 for to run the final three rounds.

Footnotes

References

External links
 Intercontinental Le Mans Cup

Intercontinental Le Mans Cup
 
Intercontinental Le Mans Cup